The 2007–08 Football League One season saw Millwall finish 17th, narrowly avoiding relegation to the fourth tier of English football. This was Millwall's 82nd season in the Football League and 39th in the third tier and Kenny Jackett's first season in charge of the club.

Results

Final table

Players

First-team squad
Squad at end of season

Left club during season

Reserve squad

Notes

References

External links
Official Website

2007–08
Millwall F.C.